Hakija Turajlić (1936 – 8 January 1993) was a Bosnian politician, economist and businessman who served as the first Deputy Prime Minister of the Republic of Bosnia and Herzegovina from 15 June 1992 until he was killed on 8 January 1993.

Prior to the start of the 1992–95 war in Bosnia and Herzegovina, Turajlić was the director of the multifaceted Bosnian company Energoinvest and as such secured large sums of money for war preparations. He was known for his ability to cooperate, especially for persuading everyone through his own self-denial and hard work. His death at the hands of the Bosnian Serb Army in the Sarajevo neighbourhood of Stup was one of the great losses that the Bosnian government was to sustain during the war.

Death

On 8 January 1993, Turajlić went to Sarajevo International Airport to greet Orhan Sefa Kilercioğlu who had accompanied an aid shipment from Turkey. In order to return to Sarajevo he had to pass through Serb-controlled territory for which UNPROFOR was supposed to provide protection. The UN convoy which was taking Turajlić to Sarajevo was stopped by Serb soldiers at a roadblock a few kilometers from the airport. After a 90-minute standoff, a French UNPROFOR officer opened the door to the armoured personnel carrier in which Turajlić was sitting and a Serb soldier opened fire with an AK-47. Turajlić was hit with 7–8 rounds. The French troops did not return fire, call for reinforcements — less than six hundred yards away — or detain the killers. British troops who arrived on the scene were ordered to leave. When the same French peacekeepers came home to France, they were decorated for heroism.

His death strained relations between the Bosnian government and UNPROFOR and was also the reason that peace talks in Geneva were cancelled. The United Nations and the Serbs both refused to cooperate with the Bosnian government investigation and help find the killer. A Bosnian Serb soldier, Goran Vasić, was eventually charged with Turajlić's murder but ultimately acquitted of that charge in 2002. In 1998, a wall about ten meters long and just under two meters high, reminiscent of the Berlin Wall, was put up by residents in Dobrinja after the Bosnian police entered a Bosnian Serb suburb to arrest Vasić.

Honors
A street in the Dobrinja section of Sarajevo is named in Turajlić's honor.

A Boxing tournament Memorijal Hakija Turajlić takes place in Sarajevo every year in his honor. Since 1994, more than 400 boxers from 30 countries participated in this tournament. From 1998 until 2008, it was one of strongest amateur boxing tournaments in Bosnia and Herzegovina.

References

External links

1936 births
1993 deaths
People from Čapljina
Bosniaks of Bosnia and Herzegovina
Bosnia and Herzegovina Muslims
Politicians of the Bosnian War
Government ministers of Bosnia and Herzegovina
People killed in the Bosnian War
Deaths by firearm in Bosnia and Herzegovina
Assassinated Bosnia and Herzegovina politicians
People murdered in Bosnia and Herzegovina
1993 crimes in Bosnia and Herzegovina
1993 murders in Europe
1990s murders in Bosnia and Herzegovina